George-Daniel de Monfreid (14 March 1856 – 26 November 1929) was a French painter and art collector.

He was born at   New York City, in the United States, but spent his childhood in the south of France. Early he decided on a career in art, and enrolled at the Académie Julian, and formed friendships with Paul Gauguin, Verlaine and Aristide Maillol.

Initially his work was Impressionist and Neo-Impressionist, but his close association with Les Nabis group pushed his style in the direction of Gauguin.

He was also an art collector and a patron of the arts. Along with Gustave Fayet, he was one of the first collectors of the works of Gauguin at the time he was exiled in the Pacific.  He was also one of the first biographers of Gauguin. He was also influenced by the cubism of Pablo Picasso late in his career.
He died in  Corneilla-de-Conflent in 1929.

1856 births
1929 deaths
19th-century French painters
French male painters
20th-century French painters
20th-century French male artists
Painters from New York City
Académie Julian alumni
19th-century French male artists